Tiktaalik (Inuktitut  ) is a monospecific genus of extinct sarcopterygian (lobe-finned fish) from the Late Devonian Period, about 375 Mya (million years ago), having many features akin to those of tetrapods (four-legged animals). Tiktaalik is estimated to have had a total length of  based on various specimens.

Unearthed in Arctic Canada, Tiktaalik is a non-tetrapod member of Osteichthyes (bony fish), complete with scales and gills – but it has a triangular, flattened head and unusual, cleaver-shaped fins. Its fins have thin ray bones for paddling like most fish, but they also have sturdy interior bones that would have allowed Tiktaalik to prop itself up in shallow water and use its limbs for support as most four-legged animals do. Those fins and other mixed characteristics mark Tiktaalik as a crucial transition fossil, a link in evolution from swimming fish to four-legged vertebrates. This and similar animals might be the common ancestors of all vertebrate terrestrial fauna: amphibians, reptiles, birds, and mammals. 

The first well-preserved Tiktaalik fossils were found in 2004 on Ellesmere Island in Nunavut, Canada. The discovery, made by Edward B. Daeschler of the Academy of Natural Sciences, Neil H. Shubin from the University of Chicago, and Harvard University Professor Farish A. Jenkins Jr, was published in the April 6, 2006, issue of Nature and quickly recognized as a transitional form.

Description
Tiktaalik provides insights on the features of the extinct closest relatives of the tetrapods.

Skull and neck 
 The skull of Tiktaalik was low and flat, more similar in shape to that of a crocodile than most fish. The rear of the skull was excavated by a pair of indentations known as Optic nonchaotic notches. These notches likely housed spiracles on the top of the head, which suggest the creature had primitive lungs as well as gills. Tiktaalik also lacked a characteristic that most fishes have—bony plates in the gill area that restrict lateral head movement. This makes Tiktaalik the earliest known fish to have a neck, with the pectoral girdle separate from the skull. This would give the creature more freedom in hunting prey on land or in the shallows.

Limbs 
Unlike many previous, more fishlike transitional fossils, the "fins" of Tiktaalik have basic wrist bones and simple rays reminiscent of fingers. The homology of distal elements is uncertain: exactly how did the bones of the lower limbs evolve into the feet and toes of vertebrates? There have been suggestions that the fin rays of Tiktaalik are homologous to digits, although this is incompatible with the digital arch developmental model, a hypothesis describing how the two parallel bones of lower limbs evolved to produce feet. According to this model, digits are supposed to be postaxial structures, but only three of the (reconstructed) eight rays of Tiktaalik are postaxial.

However, the proximal series (bones of the upper limb) can be directly compared to the ulnare and intermedium of tetrapods. The fin was clearly weight bearing, being attached to a massive shoulder with expanded scapular and coracoid elements and attached to the body armor, large muscular scars on the ventral surface of the humerus, and highly mobile distal joints. The bones of the forefins show large muscle facets, suggesting that the fin was both muscular and had the ability to flex like a wrist joint. These wrist-like features would have helped anchor the creature to the bottom in a fast current.

Torso 
Strong lungs (as supported by the plausible presence of a spiracle) may have led to the evolution of a more robust ribcage, a key evolutionary trait of land-living creatures. The more robust ribcage of Tiktaalik would have helped support the animal's body any time it ventured outside a fully aquatic habitat.

Tiktaalik is sometimes compared to gars (esp. Atractosteus spatula, the alligator gar) of the family Lepisosteidae, with whom it shares a number of characteristics:
 Diamond-shaped scale patterns common to the Crossopterygii class (in both species scales are rhombic, overlapping and tuberculated);
 Teeth structured in two rows;
 Both internal and external nostrils;
 Tubular and streamlined body;
 Absence of anterior dorsal fin;
 Broad, dorsoventrally compressed skull;
 Paired frontal bones;
 Marginal nares;
 Subterminal mouth;
 Lung-like organ.

Paleobiology
 
Tiktaalik generally had the characteristics of a lobe-finned fish, but with front fins featuring arm-like skeletal structures more akin to those of a crocodile, including a shoulder, elbow, and wrist. The fossil discovered in 2004 did not include the rear fins and tail, which were found in other specimens. It had rows of sharp teeth indicative of a predator fish, and its neck could move independently of its body, which is not common in other fish (Tarrasius, Mandageria, placoderms, and extant seahorses being some exceptions; see also Lepidogalaxias and Channallabes apus). The animal had a flat skull resembling a crocodile's; eyes on top of its head; a neck and ribs similar to those of tetrapods, with the ribs being used to support its body and aid in breathing via lungs; well developed jaws suitable for catching prey; and a small gill slit called a spiracle that, in more derived animals, became an ear. Spiracles would have been useful in shallow water, where higher water temperature would lower oxygen content.

The discoverers said that in all likelihood, Tiktaalik flexed its proto-limbs primarily on the floor of streams and may have pulled itself onto the shore for brief periods. In 2014, the discovery of the animal's pelvic girdle was announced; it was strongly built, indicating the animal could have used them for moving in shallow water and across mudflats. Neil Shubin and Daeschler, the leaders of the team, have been searching Ellesmere Island for fossils since 2000:

Paleoecology 
The fossils of Tiktaalik were found in the Fram Formation, deposits of meandering stream systems near the Devonian equator, suggesting a benthic animal that lived on the bottom of shallow waters and perhaps even out of the water for short periods, with a skeleton indicating that it could support its body under the force of gravity whether in very shallow water or on land. At that period, for the first time, deciduous plants were flourishing and annually shedding leaves into the water, attracting small prey into warm oxygen-poor shallows that were difficult for larger fish to swim in.

Classification and evolution

Tiktaalik roseae is the only species classified under the genus. Tiktaalik lived approximately 375 million years ago. It is representative of the transition between non-tetrapod vertebrates (fish) such as Panderichthys, known from fossils 380 million years old, and early tetrapods such as Acanthostega and Ichthyostega, known from fossils about 365 million years old. Its mixture of primitive fish and derived tetrapod characteristics led one of its discoverers, Neil Shubin, to characterize Tiktaalik as a "fishapod".

Tiktaalik is a transitional fossil; it is to tetrapods what Archaeopteryx is to birds, troodonts and dromaeosaurids. While it may be that neither is ancestor to any living animal, they serve as evidence that intermediates between very different types of vertebrates did once exist. The mixture of both fish and tetrapod characteristics found in Tiktaalik include these traits:

Fish
Fish gills
Fish scales
Fish fins
"Fishapod"
Half-fish, half-tetrapod limb bones and joints, including a functional wrist joint and radiating, fish-like fins instead of toes
Half-fish, half-tetrapod ear region
Tetrapod
Tetrapod rib bones
Tetrapod mobile neck with separate pectoral girdle
Tetrapod lungs

Classification

2006–2010: Elpistostegids as tetrapod ancestors

The phylogenetic analysis of Daeschler et al. (2006) placed Tiktaalik as a sister taxon to Elpistostege and directly above Panderichthys, which was preceded by Eusthenopteron. Tiktaalik was thus inserted below Acanthostega and Ichthyostega, acting as a transitional form between limbless fish and limbed vertebrates ("tetrapods"). Some press coverage also used the term "missing link", implying that Tiktaalik filled an evolutionary gap between fish and tetrapods. Nevertheless, Tiktaalik has never been claimed to be a direct ancestor to tetrapods; rather, its fossils help to illuminate evolutionary trends and approximate the hypothetical true ancestor to the tetrapod lineage, which would have been similar in form and ecology.

In its original description, Tiktaalik was described as a member of Elpistostegalia, a name previously used to refer to particularly tetrapod-like fish such as Elpistostege and Panderichthys. Daeschler et al. (2006) recognized that this common usage referred to a paraphyletic grade, since elpistostegalian fish have few unique traits not also inherited by later tetrapods. In response, they redefined Elpisostegalia as a clade, including all vertebrates descended from the common ancestor of Panderichthys, Elpistostege, and tetrapods. Nevertheless, they still retained the phrase "elpistostegalian fish" to refer to the grade of early elpisostegalians which had not acquired limbs, digits, or other specializations which define tetrapods. In this sense, Tiktaalik is an elpistostegalian fish. Later papers also use the term "elpisostegid" for the same category of Devonian fish.

Such order of the phylogenetic tree was initially adopted by other experts, most notably by Per Ahlberg and Jennifer Clack. However, it was questioned in a 2008 paper by Boisvert et al., who noted that Panderichthys, due to its more derived distal forelimb structure, might be closer to tetrapods than Tiktaalik or even that it was convergent with tetrapods. Ahlberg, co-author of the study, considered the possibility of Tiktaalik's fin having been "an evolutionary return to a more primitive form."

2010–present: Doubts over tetrapod ancestry

The proposed origin of tetrapods among elpistostegalian fish was called into question by a discovery made in the Holy Cross Mountains of Poland. In January 2010, a group of paleontologists (including Ahlberg) published on a series of trackways from the Eifelian stage of the Middle Devonian, about 12 million years older than Tiktaalik. These trackways, discovered at the Zachełmie quarry, appear to have been created by fully terrestrial tetrapods with a quadrupedal gait.

Tiktaalik's discoverers were skeptical about the Zachelmie trackways. Daeschler said that trace evidence was not enough for him to modify the theory of tetrapod evolution, while Shubin argued that Tiktaalik could have produced very similar footprints. In a later study Shubin expressed a significantly modified opinion that some of the Zachelmie footprints, those which lacked digits, may have been made by walking fish. However, Ahlberg insisted that those tracks could not have possibly been formed either by natural processes or by transitional species such as Tiktaalik or Panderichthys. Instead, the authors of the publication suggested that "ichthyostegalian"-grade tetrapods were the responsible trackmakers, based on available pes morphology of those animals.

Narkiewicz, co-author of the article on the Zachelmie trackways, claimed that the Polish "discovery has disproved the theory that elpistostegids were the ancestors of tetrapods", a notion partially shared by Philippe Janvier. To resolve the questions posed by the Zachelmie trackways, several hypotheses have been suggested. One approach maintains that the first pulse of elpistostegalian and tetrapod evolution occurring in the Middle Devonian, a time when body fossils showing this trend are too rare to be preserved. This maintains the elpistostegalian-tetrapod ancestor-descendant relationship apparent in fossils, but also introduces long ghost lineages required to explain the apparent delay in fossil appearances. Another approach is that elpistostegalian and tetrapod similarities are a case of convergent evolution. In this interpretation, tetrapods would originate in the Middle Devonian while elpisostegalians originate independently in the Late Devonian, before going extinct near the end of the period.

Estimates published after the discovery of Zachelmie tracks suggested that digited tetrapods may have appeared as early as 427.4 Ma ago and questioned attempts to read absolute timing of evolutionary events in early tetrapod evolution from stratigraphy.

However, a reanalysis in 2015 of the Zachelmie trackways find that it fails the criteria for it being identified as Devonian tetrapod trackways and were instead reinterpreted as fish nests or feeding traces.

Until more data become available, the phylogenetic position of Tiktaalik and other elpistostegids remains contested.

Discovery 

In 2004, three fossilized Tiktaalik skeletons were discovered in the Late Devonian fluvial Fram Formation on Ellesmere Island, Nunavut, in northern Canada. Estimated ages were reported at 375 Ma, 379 Ma, and 383 Ma. At the time of the species' existence, Ellesmere Island was part of the continent Laurentia (modern eastern North America and Greenland), which was centered on the equator and had a warm climate. When discovered, one of the skulls was found sticking out of a cliff. Upon further inspection, the fossil was found to be in excellent condition for a 375-million-year-old specimen.

The discovery by Daeschler, Shubin, and Jenkins was published in the April 6, 2006, issue of Nature and quickly recognized as a transitional form. Jennifer A. Clack, a Cambridge University expert on tetrapod evolution, said of Tiktaalik, "It's one of those things you can point to and say, 'I told you this would exist,' and there it is." 
 

The name Tiktaalik is an Inuktitut word meaning "large freshwater fish". The "fishapod" genus received this name after a suggestion by Inuit elders of Canada's Nunavut Territory, where the fossil was discovered. The specific name roseae cryptically honours an anonymous donor. Taking a detailed look at the internal head skeleton of Tiktaalik roseae, in the October 16, 2008, issue of Nature, researchers show how Tiktaalik was gaining structures that could allow it to support itself on solid ground and breathe air, a key intermediate step in the transformation of the skull that accompanied the shift to life on land by our distant ancestors.

Cultural significance

Tiktaalik has been used as the subject of various Internet memes. The images generally humorously criticize Tiktaalik for its evolutionary adaptations, construing them as playing a critical role in the chain of events that would eventually lead to all human suffering.

In addition to that, it has become a protagonist of "Tiktaalika", a progressive metal solo release by Haken's guitarist Charlie Griffiths. Besides the lyrics humorously praising its merits as an ancestor of modern day humanity, an animated drawing of Tiktaalik is featured in the music videos for the album's single releases: "Arctic Cemetery", "Luminous Beings" and the instrumental title track.

See also 

 Walking fish
 Alligator gar
 Amphibious fish
 Spotted handfish

Other lobe-finned fish found in fossils from the Devonian Period:

 Coelacanth
 Eusthenopteron
 Gogonasus
 Ichthyostega
 Panderichthys

References

External links

University of Chicago website dedicated to the discovery

Finding Tiktaalik: Interview with Neil Shubin, Royal Institution video, February 2013
A today's fish with tetrapod anatomy, able to move like an early tetrapod – Cryptotora thamicola

Stegocephalians
Monotypic fish genera
Prehistoric lobe-finned fish genera
Devonian fish of North America
Paleozoic life of Nunavut
Evolution of tetrapods
Transitional fossils
Fossil taxa described in 2006
Taxa named by Ted Daeschler
Taxa named by Neil Shubin